Energy Technology Perspectives (ETP) is a publication on energy technology published by the International Energy Agency’s (IEA).  It demonstrates how technologies can help achieve the objective of limiting the global temperature rise to 2°C and enhancing energy security.

G8 leaders invited the International Energy Agency to contribute to the Gleneagles G8  Plan of Action on Climate Change, Clean Energy and Sustainable Development in 2005. They asked the IEA to advise on alternative scenarios and strategies for a "clean, clever, competitive energy future". The results of this initiative included the Energy Technology Perspectives, first published in 2006.

Energy Technology Perspectives (ETP) gives a long-term outlook on the global energy system. The main results are presented up to the year 2050. For the 2012 edition the analysis was extended to include scenarios up to 2075. ETP models the global energy system under different scenarios for around 500 technology options.

Aimed at policymakers, energy experts, business leaders and investors the book's purpose is to serve as a guide for decision makers on energy trends when setting policy and business objectives concerning energy technology.

The book is accompanied by an online component that includes data visualisations, downloadable data and figures complements. Information on the modelling methodology, assumptions and results are also presented online.

ETP 2014
Energy Technology Perspectives 2014 (ETP 2014) was published in May 2014.

The publication focuses on electricity’s potential to increase energy efficiency and reduce emissions in the long term. Limiting the long-term global temperature increase to 2 degrees remains a central objective of the work. 
The book, subtitled "Harnessing Electricity’s Potential" explains that electricity is key to sustainable energy systems for the future and focuses on what this means for generation, distribution and end-use consumption.

ETP 2014 explores the possibility of "pushing the limits" in six areas:

 Decarbonising energy supply: is solar the answer to a cleaner energy future?
 What role will natural gas play: flexibility vs. base load?
 Electrified transport: how quickly and far can we go?
 Can energy storage become a game-changer?
 What is the best way to finance low-carbon sources for electricity generation?
 How can India prepare for population growth-driven energy demand increases?

Other publications in the IEA Energy Technology series 
Energy Technology Perspectives scenarios are also the basis for other technology and sector focused IEA publications.

Transition to Sustainable Buildings 
Transition to Sustainable Buildings presents detailed scenarios and strategies to 2050, and demonstrates how to reach deep energy and emissions reduction in the buildings sector through a combination of best available technologies and intelligent public policy. 
This publication is one of three end-use studies, together with industry and transport, which looks at the role of technologies and policies in transforming the way energy is used. It was published in June 2013.

Tracking Clean Energy Progress 2013 
The Tracking Clean Energy Progress 2013 is the IEA’s input to the Clean Energy Ministerial. It examines progress in the development and deployment of key clean energy technologies. Each technology and sector is tracked against interim 2020 targets in the IEA 2012 ETP 2 °C scenario, which lays out pathways to a sustainable energy system in 2050.
This report provides targeted recommendations to policy makers on how to scale up deployment of key clean energy technologies.
The Clean Energy Ministerial is a global forum to share best practices and promote policies and programs that encourage and facilitate the transition to a global clean energy economy. It was published in April 2013.

Nordic Energy Technology Perspectives 
Nordic Energy Technology Perspectives is the first regional edition of the Energy Technology Perspectives series. It assesses how the Nordic region can achieve a carbon-neutral energy system by 2050. It was published in January 2013.

Previous Editions

ETP 2012 
Energy Technology Perspectives 2012 (ETP 2012) presents global scenarios and strategies to 2050, a special chapter with scenario analysis to 2075 and detailed scenarios for nine world regions.

ETP 2010 
ETP 2010 builds on the success of earlier editions by providing updated scenarios with greater regional detail giving insights on which new technologies will be most important in the different regions of the world.
It highlights the key technological challenges and opportunities in each of the main energy-using sectors and describes the new policies that will be needed to realise change.

ETP 2008 
The second edition of Energy Technology Perspectives, ETP 2008 addresses the need of ever increasing energy supplies to sustain economic growth and development.
The study contains technology road maps for all key energy sectors, including electricity generation, buildings, industry and transport.

References 

International Energy Agency Energy Technology Perspectives
Clean Energy Ministerial
"Gleneagles Plan on Action" adopted at 31st G8 summit, 2005

External links
ETP 2012 Information 
Nordic Energy Technology Perspectives 
Tracking Clean Energy Progress 2013  
Transition to Sustainable Buildings

2006 establishments in France
Energy magazines
Magazines established in 2006
Magazines published in Paris